Sybra stigmatica is a species of beetle in the family Cerambycidae. It was described by Pascoe in 1859. It is known from Indonesia.

References

stigmatica
Beetles described in 1859